Paddy melon is a common name for two species of plants in the melon family which are invasive in Australia:

Citrullus lanatus, a sprawling plant with fruits much larger than a golf ball, a weedy form of the cultivated watermelon
Cucumis myriocarpus, a sprawling plant with fruits smaller than a golf ball